The 2016–17 Akron Zips men's basketball team represented the University of Akron during the 2016–17 NCAA Division I men's basketball season. The Zips, led by 13th-year head coach Keith Dambrot, played their home games at the James A. Rhodes Arena as members of the East Division of the Mid-American Conference. They finished the season 27–9, 14–4 in MAC play to win the MAC East Division and MAC overall regular season championship. They defeated Eastern Michigan and Ball State to advance to the championship game of the MAC tournament where they lost to Kent State, losing in the championship game for the second consecutive year. As a regular season conference champion who failed to win their conference tournament, they received an automatic bid to the National Invitation Tournament where they defeated Houston in the first round before losing to Texas–Arlington.

Following the season, head coach Keith Dambrot left the school on March 30, 2017 to accept the head coaching position at Duquesne. On April 5, the school hired former Ohio and Illinois head coach John Groce to replace Dambrot.

Previous season
The Zips finished the 2015–16 season 26–9, 13–5 record in conference, winning the East Division title as well as the overall regular season MAC championship. The Zips defeated Eastern Michigan and Bowling Green to advanced to the championship of the MAC tournament where they lost to Buffalo. As a regular season conference champion who failed to win their conference title, they received an automatic bid to the National Invitation Tournament where they lost to Ohio State in the first round.

Departures

Recruiting

Class of 2016

Class of 2017

Roster

Schedule and results

|-
!colspan=9 style=| Non-conference regular season

|-
!colspan=9 style=| MAC regular season

|-
!colspan=9 style=| MAC tournament

|-
!colspan=9 style=| NIT

See also
2016–17 Akron Zips women's basketball team

References

Akron Zips men's basketball seasons
Akron
Akron